Ightfield is a civil parish in Shropshire, England.  It contains 16 listed buildings that are recorded in the National Heritage List for England.  Of these, three are at Grade II*, the middle of the three grades, and the others are at Grade II, the lowest grade.  The parish contains the villages of Ightfield and Calverhall, and is otherwise mainly rural.  The largest building in the parish is Cloverley Hall, which is listed, together with structures in its grounds.  The other listed buildings are two churches, a lychgate, farmhouses and farm buildings, and a row of almshouses.


Key

Buildings

References

Citations

Sources

Lists of buildings and structures in Shropshire